Patrick El Mabrouk (30 October 1928 – 3 February 1994) was a French middle distance runner who competed in the 1952 Summer Olympics.

References

1928 births
1994 deaths
Olympic athletes of France
Athletes (track and field) at the 1952 Summer Olympics
French male middle-distance runners
French sportspeople of Algerian descent
European Athletics Championships medalists
Athletes (track and field) at the 1951 Mediterranean Games
Mediterranean Games gold medalists for France
Mediterranean Games medalists in athletics
20th-century French people